Eskam's daughter (fl. 448 AD) was the daughter of a Hun named Eskam, and one of the many wives of Attila, king of the Huns. She married Attila in 448 o 449 AD.

History
Eskam and his daughter are mentioned in Priscus' account of his visit to the court of Attila, around 448 AD. During their trip to Attila's favorite town, his envoy joined the king himself and a company of Huns, who were heading in the same direction after hunting in Roman territory. They spent one day at Attila's encampment and then departed with him. However, at a certain point they were forced to continue along a different route, as Attila was proceeding to a village where he would marry the daughter of a certain Eskam.

The account of Priscus has survived only in fragments, and it is possible that this Eskam had already been mentioned in the now lost text. Priscus specifies that Attila would marry Eskam's daughter even though he had many other wives, since "the Scythians (i.e. Huns) practice polygamy".

Incest hypothesis
Some authors have claimed that, rather than marrying Eskam's daughter, Attila married his own daughter, named Eskam. Father-daughter incest was practiced in some ancient societies, such as Ancient Egypt (Ramesses II and Amenhotep III alone are known to have married three of their own daughters each). Montesquieu claimed that the Tartars had the custom of marrying their own daughters. Voltaire, however, was skeptical of Montesquieu's claims regarding both Attila and the Tartars.

The discussion arose again in the 19th century. The Greek passage in Priscus literally reads: [...] where he willed to espouse daughter Eskam. This can be read both as Attila wanted to marry his daughter Eskam, or as Attila wanted to marry the daughter of Eskam. However, in the former case, the his would be missing, and Priscus should've used ἑαυτοῦ. Other scholars have argued that the Greeks always made the names of barbarians (those with whom they weren't well acquainted) indeclinable. Further, if Attila had indeed married his daughter, Priscus would've insisted on the irregularity of such a union.

Modern historians believe that Attila married the daughter of a certain Eskam.

References

Year of birth unknown
Huns
5th-century births